1341 Edmée, provisional designation , is a rare-type metallic asteroid from the central region of the asteroid belt, approximately 27 kilometers in diameter.

It was discovered on 27 January 1935, by Belgian astronomer Eugène Joseph Delporte at Uccle Observatory in Belgium, and later named after French astronomer Édmée Chandon.

Orbit and classification 

Edmée orbits the Sun in the middle main-belt at a distance of 2.5–3.0 AU once every 4 years and 6 months (1,658 days). Its orbit has an eccentricity of 0.08 and an inclination of 13° with respect to the ecliptic. The body's observation arc begins at Uccle, on the night following its official discovery observation in 1935.

Physical characteristics 

Edmée is classified as a rare XB-type in the Tholen taxonomy, an intermediary between the X and B type asteroids.

Rotation period 

American astronomer Robert Stephens obtained several rotational lightcurves of Edmée between 2004 and 2014. Best rated results include an observation taken at the Goat Mountain Research Observatory during the body's 2009-opposition, which gave a rotation period of 23.745 hours with a brightness variation of 0.05 magnitude, superseding an alternative period solution of 11.89.

Because Edmées rotation is similar to that of Earth, photometric observations are challenging. In 2013, a much shorter period was derived from a fragmentary lightcurve at the Palomar Transient Factory in California.

Diameter and albedo 

According to the surveys carried out by the Infrared Astronomical Satellite IRAS, the Japanese Akari satellite, and NASA's Wide-field Infrared Survey Explorer with its subsequent NEOWISE mission, Edmée measures between 23.86 and 27.49 kilometers in diameter, and its surface has an albedo between 0.137 and 0.182. The Collaborative Asteroid Lightcurve Link adopt the results from IRAS, that is, an albedo of 0.1371 and a diameter of 27.49 kilometers with an absolute magnitude of 10.58.

Naming 

This minor planet was named in honour of French astronomer Édmée Chandon. Naming citation was first mentioned in The Names of the Minor Planets by Paul Herget in 1955.

Notes

References

External links 
 Asteroid Lightcurve Database (LCDB), query form (info )
 Dictionary of Minor Planet Names, Google books
 Asteroids and comets rotation curves, CdR – Observatoire de Genève, Raoul Behrend
 Discovery Circumstances: Numbered Minor Planets (1)-(5000) – Minor Planet Center
 
 

 

001341
Discoveries by Eugène Joseph Delporte
Named minor planets
001341
19350127